Kindia Region (Pular: 𞤁𞤭𞥅𞤱𞤢𞤤 𞤑𞤭𞤲𞤣𞤭𞤴𞤢𞥄) is located in western Guinea. It is bordered by the country of Sierra Leone and the Guinean regions of Conakry, Labé, Mamou, and Boké.

Administrative divisions
Kindia Region is divided into five prefectures; which are further sub-divided into 45 sub-prefectures:

 Coyah Prefecture (4 sub-prefectures)
 Dubréka Prefecture (7 sub-prefectures)
 Forécariah Prefecture (10 sub-prefectures)
 Kindia Prefecture (10 sub-prefectures)
 Télimélé Prefecture (14 sub-prefectures)

References

 

Regions of Guinea